Conospermum glumaceum, commonly known as hooded smokebush, is a shrub endemic to Western Australia.

Description
Conospermum glumaceum grows as an erect shrub without a lignotuber, from 0.5 to 1.7 metres high. It has linear leaves from 1.5 to 7.5 centimetres long and one to five millimetres wide, and panicles of white, cream, yellow or purple flowers.

Taxonomy
It was first published in John Lindley's 1839 A Sketch of the Vegetation of the Swan River Colony, based on unspecified material. Lindley referred to it as a "strange species" that "has altogether the appearance of some Bupleurum with great membranous bracts." It has since had an uncomplicated taxonomic history, its only synonym being Conospermum lupulinum Endl., which was published by Stephan Endlicher in 1848, but shown to be taxonomically synonymous with C. glumaceum by Eleanor Bennett in 1995, as part of her treatment of Conospermum for the Flora of Australia series of monographs.

Distribution and habitat
It occurs in lateritic soils amongst hilly terrain, between Eneabba and Red Hill in Western Australia; thus it occurs mainly within the Geraldton Sandplains and Swan Coastal Plain biogeographic regions, with some populations in the Avon Wheatbelt and Jarrah Forest regions.

Ecology
It is not considered threatened.

References

External links

Eudicots of Western Australia
glumaceum